Johan Larsson is a Swedish musician, best known for being the former bassist and occasional backing vocalist of In Flames, being a member from 1993 until 1997. He was also the original member of HammerFall from 1993–1994, quitting before the band released any material and member of Purgamentum, also providing vocals. He is currently the vocalist of the band Carrion Carnage – currently, the band is on hiatus.

Discography

In Flames
Demo '93 – 1993 (demo)
 Lunar Strain – 1994
 Subterranean EP – 1995 (backing vocals as well)
Artifacts of the Black Rain – 1996 (promo music video/VHS)
 The Jester Race – 1996 (backing vocals as well)
Live & Plugged – 1997 (split DVD/video)
 Black-Ash Inheritance EP – 1997
 Whoracle (1997)
Bullet Ride – 2000 (compilation; track 3)

References

External links
 inflames.com

1974 births
Living people
Musicians from Gothenburg
Swedish heavy metal bass guitarists
21st-century bass guitarists
HammerFall members
In Flames members